Rodney Gunter (born January 19, 1992) is a former American football defensive end who played in the National Football League (NFL) for five seasons. He played college football at Delaware State. He was drafted by the Arizona Cardinals in the fourth round of the 2015 NFL Draft.

Professional career

Arizona Cardinals
Gunter was drafted by the Arizona Cardinals in the fourth round, 116th overall, in the 2015 NFL Draft. In his rookie year in 2015, he played 16 games making 20 tackles with 1 sack.

In 2018, Gunter recorded career-highs with 44 tackles, 4.5 sacks, and two forced fumbles through 16 games and 10 starts.

On April 8, 2019, Gunter re-signed with the Cardinals on a one-year $1.75 million deal. He played in 13 games before being placed on injured reserve on December 10, 2019 with a toe injury.

Jacksonville Jaguars
On March 24, 2020, Gunter signed a three-year contract with the Jacksonville Jaguars. He was placed on the active/non-football illness list at the start of training camp on August 8, 2020.

On August 16, 2020, Gunter retired from football, citing a heart condition.

References

External links
 Delaware State Hornets bio

1992 births
Living people
American football defensive ends
American football defensive tackles
Arizona Cardinals players
Delaware State Hornets football players
Jacksonville Jaguars players
Players of American football from Florida
Sportspeople from Polk County, Florida